Gadeh Kahriz (also Romanized as Gadeh Kahrīz; also known as Gadī Kahrīz and Gūdeh Kahrīz) is a village in Arshaq-e Gharbi Rural District, Moradlu District, Meshgin Shahr County, Ardabil Province, Iran. At the 2006 census, its population was 494, in 112 families.

References 

Towns and villages in Meshgin Shahr County